My Boyfriend's Meds is a 2020 Mexican comedy film directed by Diego Kaplan and starring Jaime Camil and Sandra Echeverría.

Cast
Marco Antonio Aguirre as El Mero
Jason Alexander as Dr. Sternbach
Luis Arrieta as Gerardo
Brian Baumgartner as Chase
Jaime Camil as Hank
Sandra Echeverría as Jess
Mónica Huarte as Susana
Brooke Shields as Alicia
Pia Watson as Mali

References

External links
 
 

2020 films
2020s Spanish-language films
Mexican comedy films
2020 comedy films
2020s Mexican films